Schwertberg is a market town in the district of Perg in the Austrian state of Upper Austria.

Geography
Schwertberg lies in the Mühlviertel. About 32 percent of the municipality is forest, and 54 percent is farmland.

Population

References

Cities and towns in Perg District